Rolf Pettersson can refer to:

 Rolf Pettersson (ice hockey) (1926-2010), Swedish ice hockey player
 Rolf Pettersson (orienteer), Swedish orienteer
 Rolf Pettersson (swimmer) (1953-2015), Swedish swimmer